Kamyshlovsky District is an administrative district (raion), one of the thirty in Sverdlovsk Oblast, Russia. As a municipal division, it is incorporated as Kamyshlovsky Municipal District. Its administrative center is the town of Kamyshlov (which is not administratively a part of the district). Population: 28,162 (2010 Census);

Administrative and municipal status
Within the framework of administrative divisions, Kamyshlovsky District is one of the thirty in the oblast. The town of Kamyshlov serves as its administrative center, despite being incorporated separately as an administrative unit with the status equal to that of the districts.

As a municipal division, the district is incorporated as Kamyshlovsky Municipal District. The Town of Kamyshlov is incorporated separately from the district as Kamyshlovsky Urban Okrug.

References

Notes

Sources

Districts of Sverdlovsk Oblast

